National costumes of Poland (Polish: stroje ludowe) vary by region. They are not worn in daily life but at folk festivals, folk weddings, religious holidays, harvest festivals and other special occasions. The costumes may reflect region and sometimes social or marital status.

Poland's inhabitants live in the following historic regions of the country: Greater Poland, Lesser Poland, Mazovia, Pomerania, Warmia, Masuria, Podlasie, Kujawy and Silesia.

Lesser Poland / Małopolska 
 Kraków region: The woman's costume includes a white blouse, a vest that is embroidered and beaded on front and back, a floral full skirt, an apron, a red coral bead necklace, and lace-up boots. Unmarried women and girls may wear a flower wreath with ribbons while married women wear a white kerchief on their head. The men wear a blue waistcoat with embroidery and tassels, striped trousers, a krakuska cap ornamented with ribbons and peacock feathers and metal rings attached to the belt.
 Lachy Sądeckie live in southern Lesser Poland, especially in Nowy Sącz County and Kotlina Sądecka.

Gorals / Górale 
Gorals live in southern Poland along the Carpathian Mountains, in Podhale of the Tatra Mountains and parts of the Beskids. Their costumes vary depending on the region.

Subcarpathian region / Podkarpacie 
 Rzeszów
 Uplanders
 Lasowiacy

Lublin region 
 Lublin region is represented by the Krzczonów folk costume
 Biłgoraj

Silesia / Śląsk 
 Bytom / Piekary Śląskie in Upper Silesia
 Cieszyn Silesia, see 
 Lower Silesia

Pomerania / Pomorze, Kujawy, Warmia 
 Kashubians inhabit Kashubia in north-central Poland. 
 Kujawy
 Pyrzyce
 Warmia

Masovia and central Poland 
Places in Masovia with distinctive costumes include:
 Łowicz 
 Kurpie of the Green and White Primeval Forests
 Wilanow 
 Opoczno
 Sieradz

Podlaskie / Podlasie 
 Podlasie

Greater Poland / Wielkopolska 
 Bambrzy
 Szamotuly
 Biskupianski

Upper class 
The szlachta were Polish nobles and had their own attire which included the kontusz, pas kontuszowy (sash) and a crimson żupan.

Burghers 
Mieszczanie were Polish burghers, among whom in 18th century czamaras gained a lot of popularity (especially in the Kraków region, hence the alternative name Kraków coat for czamara). In 19th century czamara became a Polish national and patriotic attire.

See also 
 Polish folk dances

References

External links 

Polish culture
Polish clothing
Folk costumes